The Men's combined competition of the Lillehammer 1994 Olympics was held at Kvitfjell and Hafjell.

The defending world champion was Lasse Kjus of Norway, while Luxembourg's Marc Girardelli was the defending World Cup combined champion, and Kjus shared the 1994 World Cup with countryman Kjetil André Aamodt.

Results

References 

Men's combined
Winter Olympics